Amon Murwira is Zimbabwe's Minister of Higher and Tertiary Education, Science and Technology Development. He is a member of Zanu-PF and was appointed to cabinet in 2017, after Emmerson Mnangagwa became Zimbabwe's leader.

Murwira is also a lecturer in the Department of Geography and Environmental Science at the University of Zimbabwe. He completed his postgraduate studies at the University of Twente in the Netherlands, graduating with a Master of Science in Environmental Systems Analysis and Monitoring, as well as a PhD in Information Technology and Communication.

References

Living people
Year of birth missing (living people)
Place of birth missing (living people)
ZANU–PF politicians
Government ministers of Zimbabwe
University of Twente alumni
University of Zimbabwe alumni